Seventh Mountain is an unincorporated community and census-designated place (CDP) in Deschutes County, in the U.S. state of Oregon. The community lies along the west bank of the Deschutes River southwest of Bend.

Century Drive Highway, part of the Cascade Lakes Scenic Byway, connects Bend to Seventh Mountain. From Seventh Mountain, the byway runs west to Mount Bachelor and its ski area. The CDP is closely associated with the Seventh Mountain Resort, which includes 21 lodging buildings with more than 200 condominiums.

For statistical purposes, the United States Census Bureau has defined Seventh Mountain as a census-designated place (CDP). The census definition of the area may not precisely correspond to local understanding of the area with the same name.

Demographics

References

Census-designated places in Oregon
Census-designated places in Deschutes County, Oregon
Unincorporated communities in Deschutes County, Oregon
Unincorporated communities in Oregon